Black pine may refer to:

Botany
 Within the genus Pinus:
 Pinus nigra, the Austrian pine
 Pinus thunbergii, The Japanese black pine
 Pinus jeffreyi, the Jeffrey pine, native to North America
 Within the genus Prumnopitys:
 Prumnopitys taxifolia, the matai, a New Zealand conifer
 Prumnopitys ferruginea, the miro, another New Zealand conifer
 Prumnopitys ladei, the Mount Spurgeon black pine, native to Australia
 Neorhodomela larix, a species of red algae found in intertidal areas of the North Pacific

Geography
In the United States
Black Pine, Idaho, a ghost town
Black Pine Mountains, a mountain range

Music
 The band The Black Pine